Sardar Sambhaji Chandroji Rao Angre (1920-2008) was an Indian politician . He was a Member of Parliament, representing Madhya Pradesh in the Rajya Sabha the upper house of India's Parliament as a member of the Bharatiya Jana Sangh. He was close aide of Rajmata Vijayaraje Scindia.

References

Rajya Sabha members from Madhya Pradesh
Bharatiya Jana Sangh politicians
Bharatiya Janata Party politicians from Madhya Pradesh
People of the Maratha Empire
Indian military leaders
People from Gwalior
1920 births
2008 deaths